Tom Pilkington (30 November 1921 – 8 February 2011) was a professor of medicine at St. George's Hospital, London, who specialised in metabolic medicine. His work on jejuno-ileal bypass operations contributed to the development of the surgical management of severe obesity. He was mentor to Patrick Vallance and Peter Kopelman.

Selected publications

References 

1921 births
2011 deaths
Academics of St George's, University of London
20th-century British medical doctors